Ivonne Higuero has been the Secretary General of the Convention on International Trade in Endangered Species of Wild Fauna and Flora (CITES) since 2018.

Life
Ivonne Higuero is from Panama. She was educated in the United States, earning her bachelor’s degree at the University of Missouri-Kansas City in biology and master's degree from Duke University in natural resource economics and policy. She has served with the United Nations for over 20 years.  In 2018 she was the Director of the Economic Cooperation and Trade Division for the United Nations Economic Commission for Europe when she was appointed to the position of Secretary General of CITES.  She succeeded John E. Scanlon who had held that position from 2010.

During the coronavirus pandemic in 2020 she noted that illegal wildlife trade not only helps to destroy habitats, but these habitats create a safety barrier for humans that can prevent pathogens from animals passing themselves on to people.

References

Panamanian environmentalists
Panamanian women diplomats
United Nations officials
Living people
Year of birth missing (living people)